Robert Edward John Layton  (December 25, 1925 – May 9, 2002) was a Canadian politician who served as the minister of State from 1984 to 1986.

Early career 
Robert Layton was born in Montreal, the son of Norah Lestelle (née England) and former Quebec cabinet minister Gilbert Layton. He graduated from McGill University in 1947. He spent much of his professional career running an engineering consulting business in Montreal, Quebec.

He became a political activist for the Liberal Party of Canada, running unsuccessfully in 1972 for the party's nomination for the riding of Vaudreuil.

Member of Parliament 
In the 1980s, he joined the Progressive Conservative Party, and was elected to the Parliament of Canada in the 1984 election from the Quebec riding of Lachine, covering suburban communities on the west end of the island of Montreal. He was re-elected in the 1988 election. Layton served as Minister of State for Mines in the federal cabinet of Prime Minister Brian Mulroney from 1984 to 1986, after which he served as National Caucus Chairman until 1993 when he decided to retire from politics after being diagnosed with prostate cancer.

Family 

Layton married Doris Elizabeth Steeves, a grand-niece of Father of Confederation William Steeves.

Robert Layton had three sons and a daughter. His eldest son, Jack Layton became a leader of the federal New Democratic Party and Leader of the Official Opposition in the House of Commons. He is the grandfather of Toronto City Councillor Mike Layton.

Layton died in Montreal on May 9, 2002.

References 

 
 Robert Layton fonds, Library and Archives Canada

1925 births
2002 deaths
Canadian monarchists
Robert Layton
McGill University alumni
Members of the 24th Canadian Ministry
Members of the House of Commons of Canada from Quebec
Members of the King's Privy Council for Canada
Politicians from Montreal
Progressive Conservative Party of Canada MPs